Kerry is an unincorporated community in Columbia County, Oregon, United States, located about 30 miles east of Astoria. It was founded  to extend the Columbia & Nehalem River Railroad and named in 1912 by lumberman Albert S. Kerry. In the 1920s it had about 200 inhabitants. Its post office opened in 1917 and closed in 1938.

References

Unincorporated communities in Columbia County, Oregon
1917 establishments in Oregon
Unincorporated communities in Oregon